The enzyme 4-hydroxyphenylacetate decarboxylase catalyzes the chemical reaction

(4-hydroxyphenyl)acetate + H+  4-methylphenol + CO2

This enzyme belongs to the family of lyases, specifically the carboxy-lyases, which cleave carbon-carbon bonds.  The systematic name of this enzyme class is 4-(hydroxyphenyl)acetate carboxy-lyase (4-methylphenol-forming). Other names in common use include p-hydroxyphenylacetate decarboxylase, p-Hpd, 4-Hpd, and 4-hydroxyphenylacetate carboxy-lyase.

References

 
 
 

EC 4.1.1
Enzymes of unknown structure